EXPO Tv or ExpoTV is an Internet TV network (video platform) in Iran that prepares, produces and broadcasts video products. It is active in the fields of trade, industry and economy of Iran and the world and has a specialized audience. It was established in 2018 by Mehrdad Manafi in Tehran, Iran as the first internet television for business, industry and economy. 

The company was discussed in Groundswell, a book by Forrester analysts Charlene Li and Josh Bernoff.

References

External links

Official Instagram

Mass media companies of Iran
Social networking services
Video hosting
Companies based in Tehran